Jose Carlos Barreiro is a São Toméan politician. He is the president of Sao Tome's electoral commission.

References

Year of birth missing (living people)
Living people
Government ministers of São Tomé and Príncipe